The Minnesota State University Marching Band (also known as The Maverick Machine) is the marching band of Minnesota State University, Mankato.  The band generates enthusiasm and excitement by promoting school spirit and morale. The group performs at home football, hockey, and basketball events. The Maverick Machine consists of five ensembles including the marching band, drumline, color guard, pep band, and the indoor winds, the first collegiate WGI winds group in Minnesota.

The group was originally formed in the 1929, as one of the first instrumental music offerings, during the transition from the Mankato Normal School to the Mankato State Teachers College. The name 'Marching Machine' was added when Clayton Tiede took the reins of the band in 1960.  The band had a longstanding tradition of excellence crossing many decades until the 90s when budgets became tighter and the marching band transitioned to a pep band only. The current band was reformed in 2013 as a result of the leadership of the current director, Michael Thursby. 

On average, the Maverick Machine plays at over 80 events per school year, for approximately 170,000 people.

References

External links 
 
 Minnesota State Marching Band on Facebook

Minnesota State University, Mankato
Minnesota State Mavericks
College marching bands in the United States
1950 establishments in Minnesota